San Quintín or San Quintin may refer to :

Chile
San Quintín Glacier

Mexico
San Quintín, Baja California
 San Quintín Volcanic Field

Philippines
San Quintin, Abra
San Quintin, Pangasinan

See also
 Saint Quentin
 Battle of St. Quentin (disambiguation)
 Quentin (disambiguation)
 San Quentin State Prison